According to a study by Humanists International (HI), Afghanistan is one of the seven countries in the world (the other six being Iran, the Maldives, Mauritania, Pakistan, Saudi Arabia and Sudan) where being an atheist or a convert can lead to a death sentence. According to the 2012 WIN-Gallup Global Index of Religion and Atheism report, Afghanistan ranks among the countries where people are least likely to admit to being an atheist.

Apostasy persecuted by Muslims

Apostasy is a crime under the sharia of Afghanistan, apostates are not seen kindly. Apostates, including atheists, are considered safe if they were brought up as Muslim and do not make their beliefs public. Apostates are usually disowned by their families. Apostasy and conversion to atheism carry death sentences in Afghanistan's Islamic legal system. Mob lynchings have also been known to happen.

Asylums

In January 2014, an Afghan man living in the UK since 2007 was granted asylum under the 1951 Refugee Convention. The man's legal team argued that he may face a death sentence if he returned. He had come to the UK with his family when he was 16, and had become an atheist while living there.

See also

 Persecution of atheists in Islamic countries
 Religion in Afghanistan
 Freedom of religion in Afghanistan
 Christianity in Afghanistan
 Islam in Afghanistan
 Demographics of Afghanistan
 Pashtunistan

References

Afghanistan
Religion in Afghanistan